WPE  may refer to:
Wall-plug efficiency, a measure of efficiency of LEDs
Wapping railway station (National Rail station code), a railway station in London, England
Western Peripheral Expressway, in the National Capital Region, India
Windows Preinstallation Environment, a replacement for MS-DOS during the installation phase of Windows
Workers' Party of Ethiopia, a political party in Ethiopia
WPE, now known as KMBZ (AM), a radio station in Kansas City, Missouri

Web Platform for Embedded, a WebKit port optimized for embedded devices